Albert A. Brown (born July 29, 1895) was a Canadian politician, barrister, lawyer and professional Canadian football player. He was elected to the House of Commons of Canada as a Member of the Conservative Party in the 1935 election to represent the riding of Hamilton East. He was a candidate in the 1940 election for the Parliament of Canada, and lost the election.

External links
 

1895 births
1971 deaths
20th-century Canadian lawyers
Conservative Party of Canada (1867–1942) MPs
Members of the House of Commons of Canada from Ontario
Politicians from Hamilton, Ontario
Players of Canadian football from Ontario
Sportspeople from Hamilton, Ontario
Lawyers in Ontario